William Russell, Lord Russell (29 September 163921 July 1683) was an English politician. He was a leading member of the Country Party, forerunners of the Whigs, who during the reign of King Charles II, laid the groundwork for opposition in the House of Commons to the accession of an openly Catholic king in Charles's brother James. This ultimately resulted in Russell's execution for treason, almost two years before Charles died and James acceded to the throne.

Early life and marriage
Born Hon. William Russell, he was the third son of William Russell, 5th Earl of Bedford, later created Duke of Bedford, and Lady Anne Carr. After the death of his elder brother Francis (1638–1679), he gained the courtesy title of Baron Russell and was thus referred to as Lord Russell.

He and Francis were at Cambridge University in 1654. They then travelled abroad, visiting Lyon and Geneva, residing for a time at Augsburg. Russell's account makes for a colourful depiction of his travels. The two made their way to Paris by 1658, and had returned to Woburn Abbey, Woburn (which was not then in its present palatial form) by December 1659.

At the Restoration in 1660, when Charles II took the throne, Russell was elected as a Member of Parliament for the borough of Tavistock, a seat traditionally held by a member of his family. For many years, Russell appears not to have been active in public affairs, but to have indulged in court intrigue, and is not recorded as speaking until 1674. In 1663 and 1664 he was engaged in two duels; he was wounded in the second one. In 1669, at age 30, he married the widowed Lady Vaughn. He thus became connected with the Earl of Shaftesbury, who had married his wife's cousin. They had a close and affectionate marriage.

Parliament

It was not until the formation of the country party (the forerunner of the Whig party), which opposed the policies of the Cabal (the inner group of advisers to the king) and Charles II's Franco-Catholic policies, that Russell began to take an active part in affairs. With a passionate zeal against Roman Catholicism ("I despise such a ridiculous and nonsensical religion" he once remarked), and an intense love of political liberty, he opposed the persecution of Protestant Dissenters. His first speech in Parliament appears to have been on 22 January 1674, when he inveighed against the Great Stop of the Exchequer, the attack on the Smyrna fleet, the corruption by French money of Charles's courtiers, and the ill-intended ministers of the king. He also supported the proceedings against the Duke of Buckingham. In 1675, Russell moved an address to the king for the removal from royal councils and impeachment of the Earl of Danby.

On 15 February 1677, in the debate on the 15 months' prorogation (an extremely lengthy period between sessions of Parliament), he moved the dissolution of Parliament; and in March 1678 he seconded the address that asked the king to declare war against France. The enmity of the country party towards James, the Duke of York, and towards Lord Danby, and the party's desire for a dissolution and the disbanding of the army, were greater than the party's enmity towards Louis XIV of France. The French king, therefore, found it easy to form a temporary alliance with Russell, Holles and the opposition leaders. They sought to cripple the king's power of hurting France and to compel him to seek Louis's friendship; that friendship, however, was to be given only on the condition that Louis support their goals. Russell entered into close communication with the Marquis de Ruvigny (Lady Russell's maternal cousin), who came over to England with money for distribution among members of parliament. By the testimony of Barillon, however, it is clear that Russell himself refused to take any French payments.

The alleged Popish Plot and the Monmouth Rebellion

Anti-French, warmongering alarms which culminated in the "discovery" in 1678 of the first "conspirators" of an alleged Popish Plot to treacherously murder King Charles II and accelerate the accession of his Roman Catholic brother, appear to have affected Russell more than his otherwise sober character would have led people to expect. Russell threw himself into the small party which looked to James Scott, 1st Duke of Monmouth ("Monmouth") to take the throne, an (illegitimate but recognised) son of Charles, as the representative of Protestant interests, a political blunder. Undaunted, Russell afterwards was in confidential communication with William of Orange who, with his wife Mary, came to the throne five years after Russell's execution.

Exclusion debates

On 4 November 1678, Russell moved an address to the King to exclude his brother James (at the time the Duke of York) "from his person and councils" (homes, companionship and correspondence), including removal from the line of succession. Parliament's insistence on the impeachment of Danby led to it being prorogued on 30 December and dissolved in January. At the ensuing election, Russell was again elected to Parliament, this time as a representative for Bedfordshire, as well as for Hampshire (for which he chose not to sit). The success of the newly formed "party" in the elections of 1679 led to Danby's removal from cabinet, and in April 1679 Russell became a member of the new Privy Council ministry formed by Charles on the advice of Sir William Temple of Temple Mount, East Sheen. Only six days after this, Russell moved for a committee to draw up a more subdued bill "to secure religion and property [in case of] a popish successor". In June 1679, when the Covenanters were rising in Scotland, he verbally attacked (the Duke of) Lauderdale personally in full council.

 In January 1680, Russell, along with Cavendish, Capell, Powle, and Essex, tendered resignation, which was received by King Charles "with all my heart." On 16 June, he accompanied Shaftesbury when the latter indicted James at Westminster as a popish recusant; and on 26 October, he spoke in the house to move to "suppress popery and prevent a popish successor"; while on 2 November, now at the height of his influence, he seconded the motion for exclusion in its most emphatic shape, and on 19 November physically carried the exclusion bill to the House of Lords. He opposed the limitation scheme on the ground that monarchy under its conditions would be an absurdity. The historian Laurence Echard stated that Russell opposed the indulgence exercised by Charles to the Duke of Norfolk's cousin, Lord Stafford, who was a convicted "plotter", in preventing a more painful method of execution—an indulgence afterwards shown to Russell himself but other historians disagree. On 18 December, he moved to refuse supplies until the king passed the Exclusion Bill. The Prince of Orange having come over at this time, the opposition leaders were open to a compromise on the exclusion question. Russell, however, refused to give way.

On 26 March 1681, in the parliament held at Oxford, Russell again seconded the Exclusion Bill. Upon the dissolution of parliament, he retired into privacy at his country seat of Stratton in Hampshire. It was probably at his wish that his chaplain wrote the Life of Julian the Apostate, in reply to Dr Hickes's sermons, defending the lawfulness of resistance in extreme cases.

Rye House Plot

He had no share in the schemes of Whig Lord Shaftesbury after the election of Tory sheriffs for London in 1682; upon the 1683 violation of the charters, however, he began seriously to consider the best means of resisting the King's government. In October 1682, he attended a meeting at which what might be construed as treason was talked: Monmouth, Essex, Hampden, Algernon Sidney, Lord Howard of Escrick and Sir Thomas Armstrong met at the house of one Mr Sheppard, a wine merchant. There they met Richard Rumbold, the owner of Rye House, a fortified mansion in Hertfordshire.

This was followed by the unsuccessful Rye House Plot, a plan to ambush Charles II and his brother James near Rye House, Hoddesdon, on their way back to London from the Newmarket races. However, the plot was disclosed to the government. Unlike several co-conspirators, Russell refused to escape to Holland. He was accused of promising his assistance to raise an insurrection and bring about the death of the king. He was sent on 26 June 1683 to the Tower of London where he prepared himself for his death. Monmouth offered to return to England and be tried if doing so would help Russell, and Essex refused to abscond for fear of injuring his friend's chance of escape. However, he was tried and convicted of treason and sentenced to be hanged, drawn and quartered, afterwards commuted by Charles II to death by beheading.

By the standards of the time (when those charged with treason rarely escaped death) he received a fair trial. Lord Chief Justice Francis Pemberton, in his summing up to the jury, clearly leaned towards an acquittal, thereby offending the King, who dismissed him soon afterwards. No defence counsel was permitted in a treason trial until the passing of the Treason Act 1695, but in a rare concession to the defence, Lady Russell was allowed to act as her husband's secretary. Even Jeffreys, leading for the prosecution, conducted the trial in a sober and dignified manner quite different from his normal bullying style, and, while stressing the strength of the evidence, reminded the jury that no innocent man should have his life taken away.

After the verdict Russell's wife and friends made desperate efforts to save him, making pleas for mercy to the King, the Duke of York, and the French Ambassador, Paul Barillon. Barillon informed the King that in the view of Louis XIV this was a suitable case for mercy, and James was at least prepared to listen to Russell's friends; but Charles was implacable, saying "if I do not take his life he will shortly take mine." Russell himself, in petitions to Charles and James, offered to live abroad if his life were spared, and never again to meddle in the affairs of England. He, however, refused an offer of escape from Cavendish. Lady Russell obtained a private interview and went on her knees to the King, but to no avail: Charles, who had shown clemency to former opponents after his Restoration, no longer believed in showing mercy to his real or supposed enemies.

Execution

Russell spent his last day peacefully in the Tower, spending the morning in devotions with the Scottish archbishop Alexander Burnet. He was beheaded by Jack Ketch on 21 July 1683 at Lincoln's Inn Fields. The execution was said to have been conducted quite poorly by Ketch, who later wrote a letter of apology. Russell was exonerated by reversal of his attainder under William III.

Russell did not confess; in fact, he pleaded that he knew of no plot to execute the king and was not party to any conspiracy to do so. He is recorded as having admitted to conspiring to levy a war. Such a mini-invasion ultimately took place and was successful; simply put, Russell did not time his meetings correctly. He resigned himself rapidly to accept his fate with dignity while still stating his innocence, but was disappointed in the justice he had received, as laid out in his last letter before his death. Russell was later pardoned as having committed no part in a directly treasonous plot, casting the evidence as hearsay. The pardon remains an official document.

Whigs later commemorated him as a mistreated martyr, supposedly put to death in retaliation for his efforts to exclude James from succession to the crown.

Several people were tried and convicted of seditious libel for publishing works about his ghost.

Reference in film and television
In series 9 of the BBC genealogy programme, Who Do You Think You Are?, it was revealed that one of his eight-times great-granddaughters is the actress Celia Imrie. Although it was not mentioned in the episode in question, other descendants of William, Lord Russell include comedian Miranda Hart and actress Anna Chancellor.

Notes

References 
 

|-

1639 births
1683 deaths
English people of Scottish descent
Executed English people
Executed politicians
Heirs apparent who never acceded
Members of the Privy Council of England
People of the Rye House Plot
People executed under the Stuarts for treason against England
British courtesy barons and lords of Parliament
Prisoners in the Tower of London
People executed by Stuart England by decapitation
English MPs 1660
English MPs 1661–1679
English MPs 1679
English MPs 1680–1681
English MPs 1681
Recipients of English royal pardons
English politicians convicted of crimes
People from Woburn, Bedfordshire
Members of the Parliament of England for Tavistock